The Girl Downstairs is a 1938 American romantic comedy film directed by Norman Taurog and starring Franciska Gaal, Franchot Tone and Walter Connolly. It is a remake of the 1936 Austrian film Catherine the Last directed by Henry Koster, which had been a major hit for Gaal.

This was Franciska Gaal's third appearance in American films, and her first for M-G-M. and was her final American film before her return to Hungary in 1940.

Plot Summary 
Wealthy playboy Paul Wagner wants to romance Rosalind Brown, but her father does not allow it, so Paul uses a maid to get access to Rosalind, however the maid falls in love with him.

Main cast
 Franciska Gaal as Katerina Linz  
 Franchot Tone as Paul Wagner  
 Walter Connolly as Mr. Brown  
 Reginald Gardiner as Willie  
 Rita Johnson as Rosalind Brown  
 Reginald Owen as Charlie Grump  
 Franklin Pangborn as Adolf Pumpfel  
 Robert Coote as Karl, Paul's Butler  
 Barnett Parker as Hugo, the Butler 
 James B. Carson as Rudolph  
 Billy Gilbert as Garage Proprietor

References

External links
 
 
 
 

1938 films
1938 romantic comedy films
1930s English-language films
Films directed by Norman Taurog
American romantic comedy films
American remakes of foreign films
Remakes of Austrian films
Films produced by Harry Rapf
American black-and-white films
Metro-Goldwyn-Mayer films
1930s American films